The peach fruit moth (Carposina sasakii) is a species of moth of the Carposinidae family. It is endemic to large parts of Asia, including Japan, Korea, China and Russia (Amur Oblast, Khabarovsk Krai, Primorsky Krai).

The wingspan is 13–17 mm.

The larvae feed on various fruits and are considered a pest on peach, apple, pear, apricot and plum. Furthermore, recorded larval food plants include jute, Cydonia oblonga and Ziziphus sativa.

Taxonomy
Carposina sasakii

References

External links
 Images at mothphotographersgroup
 
 Carponina sasakii in EPPO database (geographical distribution, host plants) 

Carposinidae
Moths of Japan
Moths described in 1900
Taxa named by Shōnen Matsumura